{{Infobox given name
| name = Devon
| image=
| imagesize=
| caption=
| pronunciation = 
| gender = Unisex
| meaning  = after the English county Devon, from the surname Devon
| region = mainly North America
| origin =
| variant forms =
| related names = Devin, Devyn
| footnotes = 
}}

The given name Devon is of uncertain origin. It is mainly a North American name, and may be derived from either the English county Devon, or from the surname Devon. A feminine variant of the name is Devonne.

 People 
Devon Alexander (born 1987), American boxer
Devon Allen (born 1994), American athlete
Devon Allman (born 1972), vocalist, guitarist, keyboardist, and songwriter
Devon Anderson (Devon Carlo Anderson, born 1987), English actor
Devon Aoki (Devon Edwenna Aoki, born 1982), Japanese-American supermodel and actress
Devon Bailey (born 1991), Canadian football player
Devon Beitzel (born 1988), American professional basketball point guard
Devon Bostick (born 1991), Canadian actor
Devon Conway (born 1991), New Zealand cricketer
Devon Dotson (born 1999), American basketball player
Devon Gearhart (Devon Gearhart, born 1995), American actor
Devon Gummersall (Devon Ryan Gummersall, born 1978), American television and film actor
Devon Hughes (aka 'Brother Devon' and 'D-Von Dudley', born 1972), American wrestler
Devon Kershaw (born 1982), Canadian cross country skier
Devon Key (born 1997), American football player
Devon Levi (born 2001), Canadian ice hockey player
Devon Malcolm (Devon Eugene Malcolm, born 1963), English cricketer
Devon McTavish (born 1984), American soccer player
Devon Morris (born 1961), Jamaican sprinter
Devon Murray (Devon Michael Murray, born 1988), Irish actor who plays Seamus Finnigan in the Harry Potter movies
Devon Odessa (born 1974), American actress and film producer 
Devon Nicholson (born 1982), Canadian professional wrestler
Devon Price, American social psychologist
Devon (actress) (born 1977), American porn actress
Devon (rapper) (Devon Martin), Canadian rapper
Devon Russell (died 1997), Jamaican rocksteady and reggae singer and record producer
Devon Saal, South African professional footballer for Milano United
Devon Sandoval, American soccer player forward for Major League Soccer Real Salt Lake
Devon (singer) (Devon Song, born 1980), lead male vocalist in Taiwanese band Nan Quan Ma Ma
Devon Sawa (Devon Edward Sawa, born 1978), Canadian actor
Devon Seron (Devon May Natividad Seron, born 1993), Filipina actress
Devon Sproule (born 1982), American musician
Devon Smith (Devon Sheldon Smith, born 1981), West Indian cricketer
Devon Soltendieck (born 1985), Canadian MuchMusic VJ
Devon Storm (Chris Ford), American wrestler
Devon Teuscher, American ballet dancer
Devon Thomas, West Indian cricketer from Antigua
Devon Torrence, American football cornerback and National Football League free agent
Devon Travis, American professional baseball Toronto Blue Jays second baseman
Devon van Oostrum, British basketball player for Laboral Kutxa of the Spanish League
Devon Werkheiser (Devon Joseph Werkheiser, born 1991), American actor and singer
Devon Williams, member of Los Angeles melodic pop punk band Osker
Devon Williams, South African rugby union player
Devon Windsor, American model
Devon White (baseball) (Devon Markes White or "Devo", born 1962), Jamaican American baseball player
Devon White (footballer) (born 1964), English footballer
Devon Wylie, American football wide receiver for the NFL San Francisco 49ers

 Fictional characters 
 Devon, one of the main characters in Power Rangers Beast Morphers Devon (The Office), Devon White, from the US TV series The Office Devon Miles, the head of the Foundation for Law and Government in the original Knight Rider series
 Devon D'Marco, from the Netflix original series Project Mc² Devon Woodcomb, from the US TV series Chuck Catarina Devon, a pirate from the manga and anime One Piece Devon, from the Disney's Pixar film Turning Red''
 Blaine Devon Anderson, Glee character

See also
Devin (name)

References

Feminine given names
English feminine given names
English-language unisex given names